Feriola longicornis is a species of parasitic fly in the family Tachinidae.

Distribution
China, Myanmar.

References

Diptera of Asia
Dexiinae
Insects described in 1957
Insects of Myanmar
Insects of China